The Madagascar rail (Rallus madagascariensis) is a species of bird in the family Rallidae.

It is endemic to Madagascar.

Description 
Its plumage is mostly plain brown with some streaks on the upperparts and upper breast. Its face and throat are greyish and its undertail is white. The bill is red and the legs are dark.

Its natural habitats are subtropical or tropical moist lowland forest, subtropical or tropical moist montane forest, and freshwater marshes.
It is threatened by habitat loss.

References

External links

 
 
 
 

Madagascar rail
Endemic birds of Madagascar
Madagascar rail
Madagascar rail
Taxonomy articles created by Polbot